North Andover High School is a public high school in the town of North Andover, Massachusetts, United States. The school is a part of the North Andover Public School System, and is the only high school in the district. Construction on the school was completed in February 2004.

Demographics 
According to Massachusetts Department of Elementary and Secondary Education statistics, the demographic distributions for race, gender and grade for the 2018–2019 academic year are listed below:

Facilities 
The school has a gymnasium with a rock climbing wall, rope ladders, an indoor track and a weight room. The performing arts center includes band and choral chambers and an 800 seat auditorium. Other features include two language labs and six computer labs. The football stadium has 4,000 seats and hosts local and regional events.

Academics 
North Andover High School offers basic AP courses. On the Massachusetts Comprehensive Assessment System, North Andover High School students are in the top half of the state, with over 95% pass rate on the English and Mathematics sections.

Athletics 

North Andover competed in the Cape Ann League from 1971 to 2012, until it moved back into the Merrimack Valley Conference. Because of total enrollment, North Andover High School is qualified in Division 2 by the Massachusetts Interscholastic Athletic Association and plays many games against non-league opponents with similar school size.

The school football team was led by head coach John Rafferty until 2015.

North Andover High School has soccer and lacrosse programs as well as a wrestling team.

Activities 
North Andover High School's Drama Guild holds four major performances every year. In January 2007, the school hosted its first One-Act festival, in which three One-Act productions were performed, a tradition that has since been discontinued. The One-Act performances were typically student directed plays. The guild is supported financially by a parent's organization.

The Pep Band plays at some school functions, including home basketball games and the Special Olympics. The school chorus was invited to sing at Carnegie Hall in April 2011 due to their gold medal rating at their competition in Philadelphia, PA.

Other extracurricular activities include academic teams (Math, Science or Model United Nations), intramural sports (Ping Pong, Environmental Club and Ultimate Frisbee), multicultural clubs (Spanish, German, and a Gay-Straight Alliance), and a dance club. The Johnson Chapter of the National Honor Society coordinates volunteer work from among the school's top ranked juniors and seniors.

Notable alumni
 Chris Honeycutt, State champion wrestler; professional MMA fighter for Bellator MMA

References

External links
North Andover Public School System
North Andover Cam
North Andover Twitter Page

Buildings and structures in North Andover, Massachusetts
Public high schools in Massachusetts